Evan Karakolis (born 30 March 1994) is a Canadian javelin thrower who currently holds the school record at Rice University (79.30m). As well as being team captain of the 2015-2016 Rice Track and Field Team, Karakolis received the Bob Quin Award for both athletic and academic excellence. Karakolis competed for Canada at the 2011 World Youth Championship in Lille, France, and finished eighth in qualifying. He holds a Master's degree in mechanical engineering from the University of Toronto.

In 2016, Karakolis won the javelin event at the Canadian Track and Field Championships and Canadian Olympic Trials with a throw of 71.77 meters. However, this distance fell below the Olympic qualifying standard of 83.00 meters and thus did not qualify him the 2016 Olympic Games in Rio de Janeiro.

In 2017, Karakolis won the javelin event at the Canadian Track and Field Championships for the second consecutive year with a throw of 73.71 meters.

In 2018, Karakolis's throw of 73.10 meters in the javelin finals at the Canadian Track and Field Championships earned him a third straight gold medal in the event.

References

Living people
1994 births
Canadian male javelin throwers
Athletes (track and field) at the 2015 Pan American Games
Pan American Games track and field athletes for Canada
Rice Owls men's track and field athletes
20th-century Canadian people
21st-century Canadian people